Carwyn Tuipulotu (born 28 September 2001) is a Welsh rugby union player, currently playing for United Rugby Championship and European Rugby Champions Cup side Scarlets. His preferred position is flanker or number 8.

Professional career
Tuipulotu was part of the Newcastle Falcons academy, and was part of the Welsh Exiles, leading to a contract with the Scarlets academy.

Tuipulotu was named in the Scarlets first-team squad for the 2020–21 Pro14 season. He was first called into the Scarlets matchday squad for a pre-season friendly against their rivals, the Ospreys, on 25 September 2020, and he did come off the bench. He made his debut in the rearranged Round 8 match of the 2020–21 Pro14 against Leinster. Tuipulotu signed his first professional contract with the Scarlets in February 2021, tying him to the region for the next four years.

Tuipulotu represented Wales U20 in the 2021 Six Nations Under 20s Championship.

On 26 March 2022, Tuipulotu scored his first try for the Scarlets, in a 41–24 win over Zebre. He scored another try in a friendly against the Saracens on 10 March 2023.

Personal life
Tuipulotu is the son of former Tonga international Katilimoni Tuipulotu, who earned 16 caps between 1994 and 2001, and played in Wales for Ebbw Vale RFC, Dunvant RFC and Neath RFC during his career. Tuipulotu is also a cousin of England internationals Mako and Billy Vunipola, Wales international number 8 Taulupe Faletau and Wales Women’s international Sisilia Tuipulotu.

The family moved to England in 2005, as Kati worked as a player-coach for New Brighton RFC. While in England, Tuipulotu attended Sedbergh School. Tuipulotu studied philosophy at Swansea University.

References

External links
itsrugby.co.uk Profile
Scarlets Profile

2001 births
Living people
Rugby union flankers
Rugby union number eights
Rugby union players from Abergavenny
Scarlets players
Welsh rugby union players